Transport for London (TfL) is a local government body responsible for most of the transport network in London, United Kingdom.

TfL has responsibility for multiple rail networks including the London Underground and Docklands Light Railway, as well as London's buses, taxis, principal road routes, cycling provision, trams, and river services. It does not control all National Rail services in London, although it is responsible for London Overground and Elizabeth line services. The underlying services are provided by a mixture of wholly owned subsidiary companies (principally London Underground), by private sector franchisees (the remaining rail services, trams and most buses) and by licensees (some buses, taxis and river services). TfL was also responsible, jointly with the national Department for Transport (DfT), for commissioning the construction of the new Crossrail Project and is now responsible for franchising its operation as the Elizabeth line.

In 2019–20, TfL had a budget of £10.3 billion, 47% of which came from fares. The rest came from grants, mainly from the Greater London Authority (33%), borrowing (8%), congestion charging and other income (12%). Direct central government funding for operations ceased in 2018. In 2020, during the COVID-19 pandemic in the United Kingdom, TfL sought urgent government support as fare revenues dropped 90%, and proposed near 40% cuts in capital expenditure.

History

TfL was created in 2000 as part of the Greater London Authority (GLA) by the Greater London Authority Act 1999. It gained most of its functions from its predecessor London Regional Transport in 2000. The first Commissioner of TfL was Bob Kiley. The first chair was then-Mayor of London Ken Livingstone, and the first deputy chair was Dave Wetzel. Livingstone and Wetzel remained in office until the election of Boris Johnson as Mayor in 2008. Johnson took over as chairman, and in February 2009 fellow-Conservative Daniel Moylan was appointed as his deputy.

TfL did not take over responsibility for the London Underground until 2003, after the controversial public-private partnership (PPP) contract for maintenance had been agreed. Management of the Public Carriage Office had previously been a function of the Metropolitan Police.

Transport for London Corporate Archives holds business records for TfL and its predecessor bodies and transport companies.  Some early records are also held on behalf of TfL Corporate Archives at the London Metropolitan Archives.

After the bombings on the underground and bus systems on 7 July 2005, many staff were recognised in the 2006 New Year honours list for the work they did. They helped survivors out, removed bodies, and got the transport system up and running, to get the millions of commuters back out of London at the end of the workday.

On 1 June 2008, the drinking of alcoholic beverages was banned on Tube and London Overground trains, buses, trams, Docklands Light Railway and all stations operated by TfL across London but not those operated by other rail companies. Carrying open containers of alcohol was also banned on public transport operated by TfL. The Mayor of London and TfL announced the ban with the intention of providing a safer and more pleasant experience for passengers. There were "Last Round on the Underground" parties on the night before the ban came into force. Passengers refusing to observe the ban may be refused travel and asked to leave the premises. The GLA reported in 2011 that assaults on London Underground staff had fallen by 15% since the introduction of the ban.

TfL commissioned a survey in 2013 which showed that 15% of women using public transport in London had been the subject of some form of unwanted sexual behaviour but that 90% of incidents were not reported to the police. In an effort to reduce sexual offences and increase reporting, TfL—in conjunction with the British Transport Police, Metropolitan Police Service, and City of London Police—launched Project Guardian.

In 2014, Transport for London launched the 100 years of women in transport campaign in partnership with the Department for Transport, Crossrail, Network Rail, the Women's Engineering Society and the Women's Transportation Seminar (WTS). The programme was a celebration of the significant role that women had played in transport over the previous 100 years, following the centennial anniversary of the First World War, when 100,000 women entered the transport industry to take on the responsibilities held by men who enlisted for military service.

COVID-19 pandemic impacts

In 2020, during the COVID-19 pandemic in the United Kingdom, TfL services were reduced. All Night Overground and Night Tube services, as well as all services on the Waterloo & City line, were suspended from 20 March, and 40 tube stations were closed on the same day. The Mayor of London and TfL urged people to only use public transport if absolutely essential, so that it could be used by critical workers. The London Underground brought in new measures on 25 March to combat the spread of the virus, by slowing the flow of passengers onto platforms. Measures included the imposition of queuing at ticket gates and turning off some escalators. In April, TfL trialled changes encouraging passengers to board London buses by the middle doors to lessen the risks to drivers, after the deaths of 14 TfL workers including nine drivers. This measure was extended to all routes on 20 April, and passengers were no longer required to pay, so that they did not need to use the card reader near the driver.

On 22 April, London mayor Sadiq Khan warned that TfL could run out of money to pay staff by the end of April unless the government stepped in. Two days later, TfL announced it was furloughing around 7,000 employees, about a quarter of its staff, to help mitigate a 90% reduction in fare revenues. Since London entered lockdown on 23 March, Tube journeys had fallen by 95% and bus journeys by 85%, though TfL continued to operate limited services to allow "essential travel" for key workers. Without government financial support for TfL, London Assembly members warned that Crossrail, the Northern line extension and other projects such as step-free schemes at tube stations could be delayed.

On 7 May, it was reported that TfL had requested £2 billion in state aid to keep services running until September 2020. On 12 May, TfL documents warned it expected to lose £4bn due to the pandemic and said it needed £3.2bn to balance a proposed emergency budget for 2021, having lost 90% of its overall income. Without an agreement with the government, deputy mayor for transport Heidi Alexander said TfL might have to issue a Section 114 notice - the equivalent of a public body going bust. On 14 May, the UK Government agreed £1.6bn in emergency funding to keep Tube and bus services running until September - a bailout condemned as "a sticking plaster" by Khan who called for agreement on a new longer-term funding model.

On 1 June 2020, TfL released details of its emergency budget for 2020–2021, revealing it planned to reduce capital investment by 39% from £1.3bn to £808m, and to cut maintenance and renewal spending by 38% to £201m.

Organisation

TfL is controlled by a board whose members are appointed by the Mayor of London, a position held by Sadiq Khan since May 2016.  The Commissioner of Transport for London reports to the Board and leads a management team with individual functional responsibilities.

The body is organised in two main directorates and corporate services, each with responsibility for different aspects and modes of transport. The two main directorates are:

London Underground, responsible for running London's underground rail network, commonly known as the tube, and managing the provision of maintenance services by the private sector. This network is sub-divided into different service delivery units:
London Underground
Deep Tube: Bakerloo, Central, Victoria, Waterloo & City, Jubilee, Northern and Piccadilly lines.
SSL (Sub Surface Lines): Metropolitan, District, Circle and Hammersmith & City lines.
Elizabeth line, a high-frequency hybrid urban–suburban rail service on dedicated infrastructure in central London (built as part of the Crossrail Project); and on National Rail lines to the east and west of the city. Operation is undertaken by MTR Elizabeth line, a private-sector concessionaire, and maintenance by Network Rail.
Surface Transport, consisting of:
Docklands Light Railway (DLR): an automatically driven light metro network in East and South London, although actual operation and maintenance is undertaken by a private-sector concessionaire (a joint venture of Keolis and Amey).
London Buses, responsible for managing the red bus network throughout London and branded services including East London Transit, largely by contracting services to various private sector bus operators. Incorporating CentreComm, London Buses Command & Control Centre, a 24-hour Emergency Control Centre based in Southwark.
London Dial-a-Ride, which provides community transport services throughout London.
London Overground, which consists of certain suburban National Rail services within London. Operation is undertaken by Arriva Rail London, a private-sector concessionaire, and maintenance by Network Rail.
London River Services, responsible for licensing and co-ordinating passenger services on the River Thames within London.
London Streets, responsible for the management of London's strategic road network.
London Trams, responsible for managing London's tram network, by contracting to private sector operators. At present the only tram system is Tramlink in South London, contracted to FirstGroup, but others are proposed.
London congestion charge, a fee charged on most cars and motor vehicles being driven within the Congestion Charge Zone in Central London.
Public Carriage Office, responsible for licensing the famous black cab taxis and private hire vehicles.
Victoria Coach Station, which owns and operates London's principal terminal for long-distance bus and coach services.
 "Delivery Planning" which promotes cycling in London, including the construction of Cycle Superhighways.
 "Special Projects Team"  manages the contract with Serco for the Santander Cycles bike rental scheme.
Walking, which promotes better pedestrian access and better access for walking in London.
London Road Safety Unit, which promotes safer roads through advertising and road safety measure.
Community Safety, Enforcement and Policing, responsible for tackling fare evasion on buses, delivering policing services that tackle crime and disorder on public transport in co-operation with the Metropolitan Police Service's Transport Operational Command Unit (TOCU) and the British Transport Police.
Traffic Enforcement, responsible for enforcing traffic and parking regulations on the red routes.
Freight Unit, which has developed the "London Freight Plan" and is involved with setting up and supporting a number of Freight Quality Partnerships covering key areas of London.

Operations centre

TfL's Surface Transport and Traffic Operations Centre (STTOC) was officially opened by Prince Andrew, Duke of York, in November 2009. The centre monitors and coordinates official responses to traffic congestion, incidents and major events in London. London Buses Command and Control Centre (CentreComm), London Streets Traffic Control Centre (LSTCC) and the Metropolitan Police Traffic Operation Control Centre (MetroComm) were brought together under STTOC.

STTOC played an important part in the security and smooth running of the 2012 Summer Olympics. The London Underground Network Operations Centre is now located on the fifth floor of Palestra and not within STTOC. The centre featured in the 2013 BBC Two documentary series The Route Masters: Running London's Roads.

Connect project
Transport for London introduced the "Connect" project for radio communications during the 2000s, to improve radio connections for London Underground staff and the emergency services. The system replaced various separate radio systems for each tube line, and was funded under a private finance initiative. The supply contract was signed in November 1999 with Motorola as the radio provider alongside Thales. Citylink's shareholders are Thales Group (33 per cent), Fluor Corporation (18%), Motorola (10%), Laing Investment (19.5%) and HSBC (19.5%). The cost of the design, build and maintain contract was £2 billion over twenty years.Various subcontractors were used for the installation work, including Brookvex and Fentons.

A key reasoning for the introduction of the system was in light of the King's Cross fire disaster, where efforts by the emergency services were hampered by a lack of radio coverage below ground. Work was due to be completed by the end of 2002, although suffered delays due to the necessity of installing the required equipment on an ageing railway infrastructure with no disruption to the operational railway. On 5 June 2006 the London Assembly published the 7 July Review Committee report, which urged TfL to speed up implementation of the Connect system.

The East London line was chosen as the first line to receive the TETRA radio in February 2006, as it was the second smallest line and is a mix of surface and sub surface. In the same year it was rolled out to the District, Circle, Hammersmith & City, Metropolitan and Victoria lines, with the Bakerloo, Piccadilly, Jubilee, Waterloo & City and Central lines following in 2007. The final line, the Northern, was handed over in November 2008.

The 2010 TfL investment programme included the project "LU-PJ231 LU-managed Connect communications", which provided Connect with a new transmission and radio system comprising 290 cell sites with two to three base stations, 1,400 new train mobiles, 7,500 new telephone links and 180 CCTV links.

London Transport Museum 
TfL also owns and operates the London Transport Museum in Covent Garden, a museum that conserves, explores and explains London's transport system heritage over the last 200 years. It both explores the past, with a retrospective look at past days since 1800, and the present-day transport developments and upgrades. The museum also has an extensive depot, situated at Acton, that contains material impossible to display at the central London museum, including many additional road vehicles, trains, collections of signs and advertising materials. The depot has several open weekends each year. There are also occasional heritage train runs on the Metropolitan line.

Fares
Most of the transport modes that come under the control of TfL have their own charging and ticketing regimes for single fare. Buses and trams share a common fare and ticketing regime, and the DLR, Overground, Underground, and National Rail services another.

Zonal fare system

Rail service fares in the capital are calculated by a zonal fare system. London is divided into eleven fare zones, with every station on the London Underground, London Overground, Docklands Light Railway and, since 2007, on National Rail services, being in one, or in some cases, two zones. The zones are mostly concentric rings of increasing size emanating from the centre of London. They are (in order):

Zone 1
Zone 2
Zone 3
Zone 4
Zone 5
Zone 6
Zones 7–9, C, G and W

Travelcard

Superimposed on these mode-specific regimes is the Travelcard system, which provides zonal tickets with validities from one day to one year, and off-peak variants. These are accepted on the DLR, buses, railways, trams, and the Underground, and provide a discount on many river services fares.

Oyster card

The Oyster card is a contactless smart card system introduced for the public in 2003, which can be used to pay individual fares (pay as you go) or to carry various Travelcards and other passes. It is used by scanning the card at a yellow card reader. Such readers are found on ticket gates where otherwise a paper ticket could be fed through, allowing the gate to open and the passenger to walk through, and on stand-alone Oyster validators, which do not operate a barrier. Since 2010, Oyster Pay as you go has been available on all National Rail services within London. Oyster Pay as you go has a set of daily maximum charges that are the same as buying the nearest equivalent Day Travelcard.

Contactless payments

Almost all contactless Visa, Maestro, MasterCard and American Express debit and credit cards issued in the UK, and also most international cards supporting contactless payment, are accepted for travel on London Underground, London Overground, Docklands Light Railway, most National Rail, London Tramlink and Bus services. This works in the same way for the passenger as an Oyster card, including the use of capping and reduced fares compared to paper tickets. The widespread use of contactless payment - around 25 million journeys each week - has meant that TfL is now one of Europe's largest contactless merchants, with one in 10 contactless transactions in the UK taking place on the TfL network.

Mobile payments - such as Apple Pay, Google Pay and Samsung Pay - are also accepted in the same way as contactless payment cards. The fares are the same as those charged on a debit or credit card, including the same daily capping. In 2020, one in five journeys are made using mobile devices instead of using contactless bank cards, and TfL had become the most popular Apple Pay merchant in the UK.

TfL's expertise in contactless payments has led other cities such as New York, Sydney, Brisbane and Boston to license the technology from TfL and Cubic.

Identity and marketing

Each of the main transport units has its own corporate identity, formed by differently coloured versions of the standard roundel logo and adding appropriate lettering across the horizontal bar. The roundel rendered in blue without any lettering represents TfL as a whole (see Transport for London logo), as well as used in situations where lettering on the roundel is not possible (such as bus receipts, where a logo is a blank roundel with the name "London Buses" to the right). The same range of colours is also used extensively in publicity and on the TfL website.

Transport for London has always mounted advertising campaigns to encourage use of the Underground. For example, in 1999, they commissioned artist Stephen Whatley to paint an interior – 'The Grand Staircase' – which he did on location inside Buckingham Palace. This painting was reproduced on posters and displayed all over the London Underground.

In 2010 they commissioned artist Mark Wallinger to assist them in celebrating the 150th anniversary of the Underground, by creating the Labyrinth Project, with one enamel plaque mounted permanently in each of the Tube's 270 stations.

In 2015, in partnership with the London Transport Museum and sponsored by Exterion Media, TfL launched Transported by Design, an 18-month programme of activities. The intention is to showcase the importance of both physical and service design across London's transport network. In October 2015, after two months of public voting, the black cab topped the list of favourite London transport icons, which also included the original Routemaster bus and the Tube map, among others. In 2016, the programme held exhibitions, walks and a festival at Regent Street on 3 July.

Typeface

Johnston (or Johnston Sans) is typeface designed by and named after Edward Johnston. The typeface was commissioned in 1913 by Frank Pick, then commercial manager of the Underground Electric Railways Company of London (also known as 'The Underground Group'), as part of his plan to strengthen the company's corporate identity. Johnston was originally created for printing (with a planned height of 1 inch or 2.5 cm), but it rapidly became used for the enamel station signs of the Underground system as well.

Johnston was originally printed using wood type for large signs and metal type for print. Johnston was redesigned in 1979 to produce New Johnston. The new family comes in eight members: Light, Medium, Bold weights with corresponding Italics, Medium Condensed and Bold Condensed. After the typeface was digitized in 1981–82, New Johnston finally became ready for Linotron photo-typesetting machine, and first appeared in London's Underground stations in 1983. It has been the official typeface exclusively used by Transport for London and The Mayor of London ever since, with minor updates to specific letterforms occurring in 1990–1992 and 2008. A new version, known as Johnston 100, was commissioned by Transport for London from Monotype in 2016 to commemorate the 100th anniversary of the introduction of the typeface, and was designed to be closer to the original version of the Johnston typeface.

Advertising bans 
In May 2019, TfL banned advertising from Saudi Arabia, Pakistan and the United Arab Emirates due to their poor human rights records. This brought the number of countries to 11 from which TfL has banned adverts, due to them having the death penalty for homosexuals. Countries previously banned from advertising were Iran, Nigeria, Saudi Arabia, Somalia, Sudan and Yemen.

In 2019, the Mayor of London, Sadiq Khan, introduced restrictions on advertising of unhealthy food and drinks across the TfL network. A study estimated that this led to a 7% reduction in the average weekly household purchase of foods high in fat, salt, and sugar. The largest reductions were seen in the sales of chocolate and sweets. There was no change in purchases of foods not classified as being high in fat, salt, and sugar.

See also

 Articulated buses in London
 Passenger transport executive
 Selective vehicle detection
 Transport in London

Notes

References

External links 

 
 London TravelWatch
 

 
Local government in London
Transport authorities in London
Public transport executives in the United Kingdom
Companies owned by municipalities of England
Greater London Authority functional bodies
2000 establishments in England
2000 in London
Transport organisations based in London